Paul Kibugi Muite (born 18 Apr 1945) is a Kenyan lawyer and politician

Political career 
He is a prominent figure in Kenya's second liberation struggle during the 1990s to remove the single party dictatorship established by the Kenya African National Union in 1982. He served as vice chairman of the Forum for the Restoration of Democracy - Kenya while it was under the tutelage of Oginga Odinga and is the founding chairman of the Safina party of Kenya. He previously served as a law clerk in the years preceding Kenya's attainment of independence. He has served several terms in the National Assembly of Kenya as member for the Kabete Constituency.

References 

1945 births
Living people
Alumni of the University of London
20th-century Kenyan lawyers
Kenyan democracy activists
Forum for the Restoration of Democracy politicians
Forum for the Restoration of Democracy – Kenya politicians
Kenya School of Law alumni
Candidates for President of Kenya
21st-century Kenyan lawyers